The Brett Whiteley Travelling Art Scholarship is an Australian annual art award in honour of the painter Brett Whiteley. The scholarship is administered by the Art Gallery of New South Wales.

Whiteley died in 1992. In 1999, his mother Beryl Whiteley (19172010) made funds available to establish a scholarship in his memory. The inspiration for the scholarship was the profound effect of international travel and study experienced by Brett as a result of winning the Italian Travelling Art Scholarship at the age of 20. 

The Brett Whiteley Travelling Art Scholarship is open to Australian artists aged between 20 and 30.  The winner receives A$25,000 and a three-month residency at the Cite Internationale des Arts in Paris.   

In 2004, Beryl Whiteley was awarded the Medal of the Order of Australia (OAM) for her service as a benefactor to the visual arts through the creation and endowment of the scholarship. Brett Whiteley himself was appointed an Officer (AO) of the order a year before his death.

In recent years, Brett Whiteley's ex-wife Wendy Whiteley has presented the prizes.  

Beryl Whiteley died on 1 April 2010, aged 93.

Winners of the Brett Whiteley Travelling Art Scholarship
 1999:	Alice Byrne, Newtown shed
 2000:	Marcus Wills, Parable of the sower
 2001:	Petrea Fellows, Treescape
 2002: Ben Quilty, Elwood Park
 2003:	Karlee Rawkins, Bitch in India
 2004:	Alan Jones (artist), Figure # 11
 2005:	Wayde Owen, Californian Quail
 2006:	Samuel Wade, Grey Day at Central
 2007:	Nathan Hawkes, Icebergs
 2008:	Amber Wallace, Untitled landscape
 2009: Nicole Kelly, Figure in landscape
 2010: Belem Lett
 2011: Becky Gibson
 2012: Mitch Cairns
 2013: Tim Phillips
 2014: James Francis Drinkwater
2015: Tom Polo
2016: Lucy O'Doherty
2017: Sally Anderson, Dilling's Bromeliads with Gullfoss Falls
2018: Natasha Walsh, Dear Frida
2020: Emily Grace Imeson, “Home Amongst Giants Study”

References

Australian art awards
1999 establishments in Australia